Livan Enrique Soto (born June 22, 2000) is a Venezuelan professional baseball shortstop and second baseman for the Los Angeles Angels of Major League Baseball (MLB).

Professional career

Atlanta Braves organization
Soto signed with the Atlanta Braves on July 2, 2016 as an international free agent. He made his professional debut for the Gulf Coast League Braves in 2017, appearing in 47 games and ending the season with a .225 batting average. He was granted free agency on November 21, 2017 after Major League Baseball voided the contracts of nine Braves' minor league players after the league announced the Braves had violated international signing rules from 2015 to 2017.

Los Angeles Angels organization
Soto signed with the Los Angeles Angels on December 15. He spent the  season with the Orem Owlz of the Pioneer League. He split the  season with the AZL Angels and the Burlington Bees, and missed the  minor league season due to the COVID-19 pandemic's cancellation of the Minor League Baseball season.

In , he advanced to the Single-A and Double-A levels, appearing with the Tri-City Dust Devils and Rocket City Trash Pandas.  

Soto began the 2022 season with Rocket City and was named the Southern League Player of the Week on July 11 after going 11 for 21 in six games. At the time, he was leading the league in hits and among the league leaders in batting average and on-base percentage.  He was promoted to the majors on September 17, 2022.

References

External links

2000 births
Living people
Arizona League Angels players
Burlington Bees players
Gulf Coast Braves players
Los Angeles Angels players
Major League Baseball infielders
Major League Baseball players from Venezuela
Orem Owlz players
Rocket City Trash Pandas players
Tri-City Dust Devils players